Daya Dharmapala Kilittuwa Gamage is a Sri Lankan politician and businessman. He is a member of parliament (MP) and former Minister of Primary Industries. And he also the national organizer for the United National Party (UNP). He elected to the Parliament of Sri Lanka at the 2015 Parliamentary Election from Ampara District by obtaining 70,201 preferential votes.

Daya Gamage was elected to the Eastern Provincial Council following the 1st Eastern provincial council election held on 10 May 2008. He was re-elected at the 2nd Eastern Provincial Council election held on 8 September 2012. He served as leader of the opposition for part of the 1st Eastern Provincial Council.

See also
List of political families in Sri Lanka

References

External links
 Dayagamage.com
 Dayasarana Development Foundation
 Manthri.lk – Daya Gamage

Alumni of Ananda College
Living people
Members of the Eastern Provincial Council
Members of the 15th Parliament of Sri Lanka
Sinhalese businesspeople
Sinhalese politicians
Sri Lankan Buddhists
United National Party politicians
Provincial councillors of Sri Lanka
Year of birth missing (living people)